Ferwoude is a village in Súdwest-Fryslân municipality in the province of Friesland, the Netherlands. It had a population of around 235 in January 2017.

History
The village was first mentioned in the 13th century as Forwalda, and means "before (=close to) the woods". Ferwoude is an agriculture community close to the former Zuiderzee dike. It is mainly low-lying land which used for animal husbandry.

The Dutch Reformed church dates from 1767 and was a replacement of a 13th century church. Ferwoude had a school before 1800. It was forced to close in 2015-2016 due to lack of students. Nowadays, it contains the village house.

Ferwoude was home to 109 people in 1840. Before 2011, the village was part of the Wûnseradiel municipality.

Gallery

References

External links

Súdwest-Fryslân
Populated places in Friesland